Kapalua is a census-designated place (CDP) in Maui County, Hawaii, United States. A resort development by the Maui Land & Pineapple Company extends inland from Kapalua Bay and Honolua Bay.  The population was 495 at the 2020 census.

Geography
Kapalua is located along the northwest coast of Maui at  along Route 30, known as the Honoapiilani Highway. The Hawaiian name for this area was Honokahua.

Kapalua has a view of the islands of Molokai and Lānai.

Climate

Recreation and leisure
Kapalua Resort offers accommodations, a variety of restaurants, a shop, and several golf courses.

The area has several beaches. The name kapa lua means "two borders" in the Hawaiian language.
Mokuleia Bay and Honolua Bay are to the north in Honolua and Nāpili is to the south. Kapalua Bay was named "Best Beach in the World" by the readers of Condé Nast Traveler magazine, "America's Best Beach" on the first annual list of Stephen Leatherman's Top 10 Beaches in America, and the "Best Beach in America" by the Travel Channel, among other honors.

During the plantation era, the Kapalua beach was known as Fleming Beach but was renamed after the resort. A public access site on Honokahua Bay about half a mile to the north was named D.T. Fleming Park in 1975 to keep the tribute to David Thomas Fleming (1881–1955), Honolua Plantation manager of the area before the resort was built.

Transportation
The small Kapalua Airport was built to the south in Honokōwai in 1987, replacing the even smaller Kaanapali Airport.

Demographics

As of the census of 2000, there were 467 people, 186 households, and 132 families residing in the CDP. The racial makeup of the CDP was 59.31% White, 0.43% African American, 11.35% Asian, 13.28% Pacific Islander, 0.21% from other races, and 15.42% from two or more races. Hispanic or Latino of any race were 3.43% of the population.

There were 186 households, out of which 25.3% had children under the age of 18 living with them, 62.9% were married couples living together, 4.3% had a female householder with no husband present, and 28.5% were non-families. 12.9% of all households were made up of individuals, and 4.3% had someone living alone who was 65 years of age or older.  The average household size was 2.51 and the average family size was 2.74.

In the CDP the population was spread out, with 17.6% under the age of 18, 6.4% from 18 to 24, 32.1% from 25 to 44, 27.2% from 45 to 64, and 16.7% who were 65 years of age or older.  The median age was 42 years. For every 100 females, there were 92.2 males.  For every 100 females age 18 and over, there were 108.1 males.

The median income for a household in the CDP was $57,292, and the median income for a family was $61,875. Males had a median income of $35,417 versus $32,321 for females. The per capita income for the CDP was $75,992.  About 5.1% of families and 7.2% of the population were below the poverty line, including 5.6% of those under age 18 and none of those age 65 or over.

References

External links

 Kapalua Resort official website

Census-designated places in Maui County, Hawaii
Populated places on Maui
Populated coastal places in Hawaii